Bordeaux-Saint-Jean or formerly Bordeaux-Midi is the main railway station in the French city of Bordeaux. It is the southern terminus of the Paris–Bordeaux railway, and the western terminus of the Chemins de fer du Midi main line from Toulouse.

The station building, situated in Bordeaux city centre at the end of the Cours de la Marne, appears from the front as three parts. The middle part is home to the station buffet and separates the arrivals and departures halls. All three parts are parallel to the platforms.
The station buildings hide a large metallic trainshed, built by Gustave Eiffel

Since the arrival of the TGV the station has been renovated and upgraded with modern equipment, but has kept its original features.

The great hall has a large map of the network of the Midi on one of the walls and reminds passengers of the origins of the station.

The station is the main railway interchange in Aquitaine and links Bordeaux to Paris, Sète, Toulouse Matabiau and Spain.

History 
The station was built in 1855 under the name Gare du Midi (Midi station) by the Chemins de fer du Midi, as the western terminus of its main line linking Bordeaux and Sète. It used to be less important than the former Bordeaux-Bastide station  connecting Bordeaux with Paris on the right bank of the river Garonne.

A long metal viaduct, built by Gustave Eiffel in 1860, allowed trains to cross the river and progressively Bordeaux-Saint-Jean became the Bordeaux main station, needing larger infrastructures.

The current station building opened in 1898. As well as Midi trains, trains from the Paris-Orléans and the État companies called there. The station was built by M Toudoire and S Choron. It includes a large metallic trainshed 56 m wide and covers 17,000 m2, one of the largest in Europe, conceived Daidé&Pillé and constructed by G. Eiffel.

Eiffel two-track bridge became a bottleneck, but it was replaced only in 2008 by a new four-track railway bridge next to it, to prepare the St-Pierre-des-Corps-Bordeaux high speed line opening in 2017.

Train services

Current services 
The following services call at Bordeaux-Saint-Jean as of January 2021:

^ indicates not all trains stop there
High speed services (TGV)
Paris - Bordeaux - Dax - Lourdes - Tarbes
Paris - Bordeaux - Dax - Bayonne - Biarritz - Hendaye
Paris - Bordeaux - Agen - Toulouse
Paris - Bordeaux - Arcachon
Paris - St-Pierre-des-corps (Tours) - Poitiers - Angoulême - Bordeaux
Lille - Aéroport CDG - Tours - Bordeaux
Strasbourg - Marne la Vallée Chessy - St-Pierre-des-corps (Tours) - Bordeaux
Discount high speed services (Ouigo TGV)
Paris Montparnasse - St-Pierre-des-corps (Tours) - Poitiers - Angoulême - Bordeaux - Agen - Montauban - Toulouse
Intercity services (Intercités)
Bordeaux - Toulouse - Montpellier - Marseille
Nantes - La Rochelle - Bordeaux
local services (TER Nouvelle-Aquitaine)
Bordeaux - Libourne - Angoulême
Bordeaux - Saintes - La Rochelle
Bordeaux - Libourne - Périgueux - Limoges
Bordeaux - Libourne - Périgueux - Brive-la-Gaillarde - Ussel
Bordeaux - Libourne - Bergerac - Sarlat-la-Canéda
Bordeaux - Arcachon
Bordeaux - Lesparre - Le Verdon
Bordeaux - Langon - Marmande - Agen
Bordeaux - Morcenx - Mont-de-Marsan
Bordeaux - Dax - Bayonne - Hendaye
Bordeaux - Dax - Pau - Tarbes

Projected services 

 High speed service (Eurostar) London St Pancras - Bordeaux in 2022
Intercity service Bordeaux-Lyon in mid 2022 by a new private societary operator Railcoop

Twinning
In October 2019, Gare de Bordeaux-Saint-Jean was twinned with London St Pancras International in England. The association was made in the hope that a high speed service could connect the two stations, and was announced at a ceremony headed by Claude Solard, Director General of SNCF.

See also
Gare de Bordeaux État (État)
Gare de Bordeaux Passerelle (PO)
Gare de Bordeaux Bastide (PO)
Gare de Bordeaux Ravezies (ex. Saint-Louis)
Gare de Bordeaux Brienne
Gare de Bordeaux Bénauge (PO-Midi-Etat)

References

External links

Gare de Bordeaux Saint-Jean

Railway stations in Gironde
Gare Saint-Jean
Railway stations in France opened in 1898